Raúl Daniel Toro Fuenzalida (born 24 June 1954) is a Chilean former footballer who played as a midfielder, and a current manager.

Playing career
Born in Santiago, Toro played for several clubs in his country during a 20-year senior career, in both the Campeonato Nacional and the second division. He spent his first nine seasons as a senior with Unión Española.

In 1992, 38-year-old Toro helped Club Deportivo Soinca Bata promote to the top level. He retired the following year, after a spell with Deportes Colchagua.

Managerial career
Toro started working as a coach in division two, successively being in charge of Deportes Colchagua and C.S.D. Rangers and helping the latter club finish runner-up in the 1996 edition of the Copa Chile. Four years later, he won the second tier championship with Unión San Felipe – where he had played in the late 80's – and, in the 2001 campaign, led the team to the eighth position.

In the 2005 Apertura, Toro coached Coquimbo Unido all the way to the final after dispatching Everton de Viña del Mar, Cobreloa and Huachipato, losing 2–4 on aggregate to Unión Española. Between 2006 and 2008 he was in charge of an historical Audax Italiano squad which included players like Fabián Orellana, Nicolás Peric, Franco Di Santo or Carlos Villanueva, qualifying them to the 2008 Copa Libertadores. However, after elimination from the competition and irregular displays in the domestic league, he was fired and replaced by Pablo Marini.

Subsequently, Toro coached Cobreloa, Curicó and Unión La Calera, before moving abroad in 2013 with Ecuador's LDU Loja.

Honours

Player
Soinca Bata
Primera B (Chile): 1992

Manager
Unión San Felipe
Primera B (Chile): 2000

Rangers
Copa Chile: Runner-up 1996

References

External links
Soccerway profile

1954 births
Living people
Footballers from Santiago
Chilean footballers
Association football midfielders
Chilean Primera División players
Primera B de Chile players
Unión Española footballers
Santiago Morning footballers
C.D. Aviación footballers
C.D. Huachipato footballers
Unión San Felipe footballers
Curicó Unido footballers
Deportes Melipilla footballers
Deportes Colchagua footballers
Chilean football managers
Deportes Colchagua managers
Rangers de Talca managers
Unión San Felipe managers
Coquimbo Unido managers
Audax Italiano managers
Cobreloa managers
Curicó Unido managers
Unión La Calera managers
Chilean Primera División managers
Primera B de Chile managers
Chilean expatriate football managers
Expatriate football managers in Ecuador
Chilean expatriate sportspeople in Ecuador